Choi Ji-eun (born May 25, 1988) is a South Korean figure skating coach and former competitor. She is a five-time South Korean national medalist, having won two silver and three bronze medals. She won the bronze medal at the 2006 ISU Junior Grand Prix in Hungary and reached the free skate at four ISU Championships.

Personal life
Choi Ji-eun was born May 25, 1988, in Daejeon, South Korea. As a child, she learned to play the piano.

Career
Choi began skating at age 10. From 2000, she was coached mainly by Shin Hea-sook in Seoul. She debuted on the ISU Junior Grand Prix series in late October 2002, placing 14th in Milan, Italy. She reached the free skate at the 2003 World Junior Championships in Ostrava by placing 13th in her qualifying group and 14th in the short program. She ranked 17th in the free skate and 18th overall.

During the summer of 2003, Choi trained in Colorado Springs, Colorado for two months, in preparation for the 2003–04 season. She became South Korea's senior national silver medalist. She injured her hip during the season.

Choi returned to Colorado Springs in the summer of 2004. Ranked 12th in the short program and 10th in the free skate, she finished 10th at the 2005 Four Continents Championships in Gangneung, South Korea. She advanced out of her qualifying group at the 2005 World Championships in Moscow, Russia, but was eliminated after placing 30th in the short program. She injured her knee and thigh during the season.

Ahead of the 2005–06 season, Choi again spent two months training in Colorado Springs. As the leading South Korean senior ladies' skater, she competed at the 2005 Karl Schäfer Memorial to qualify a spot for her country in the ladies' event at the 2006 Winter Olympics, but her placement, 11th, was insufficient. She sustained a serious ankle injury prior to the 2006 Four Continents Championships. She placed 17th in the short, 12th in the free, and 13th overall at Four Continents, held in Colorado Springs. At the 2006 World Championships in Calgary, she placed 20th in her qualifying group, which meant she did not advance to the short program.

In the summer of 2006, Choi trained under Josée Chouinard at the Granite Club in Toronto, Ontario, Canada. She won the bronze medal at the 2007 South Korean Championships among four senior ladies. Coached by Shin Hea-Sook at the start of 2006–07, she had switched to Lee Kyu-hyun by the end of the season. At the 2007 World Junior Championships, held in Oberstdorf, Germany, she placed 14th in the short program, 20th in the free skate, and 20th overall.

Choi has been credited with performing a flying layback spin in competition. She is one of the few skaters to achieve this distinction.

Programs

Competitive highlights

References

External links
 

South Korean female single skaters
Figure skaters at the 2007 Winter Universiade
1988 births
Living people
Figure skaters at the 2007 Asian Winter Games
Sportspeople from Daejeon